Celina Szymanowska (16 July 1812 – 5 March 1855) was a daughter of the Polish composer and pianist Maria Agata Szymanowska and the wife of the Polish Romantic poet Adam Mickiewicz.

Life
Celina Szymanowska, daughter of Mickiewicz's late friend the pianist Maria Agata Szymanowska, married the 14-years-older Adam Mickiewicz in Paris on 22 July 1834.  The couple had six children:  daughters Maria and Helena; and four sons, Władysław Mickiewicz (1838–1926), Józef Mickiewicz (1850–1938), Aleksander Mickiewicz and Jan Mickiewicz.

Celina roused the dislike of other Polish émigrés, including the Romantic poet Zygmunt Krasiński.  She was accused of extravagance, poor cooking skills, a desire to dominate her husband, and mental instability.

In 1838 Celina declared herself a prophet, an incarnation of the Mother of God, and redeemer of Poland, of Polish émigrés and of the Jews.  She also claimed to possess a power to heal, which she said she had successfully applied to the gravely ill Adolf Zaleski.

For a time, Adam Mickiewicz cared for his wife himself; but marital discord and Celina's mental illness drove him to attempt suicide on 17 or 18 December 1838 by jumping out a window.

When he found that Celina's mental state was getting worse, Mickiewicz had her committed to a mental hospital at Vanves, where she underwent sleep deprivation, cold-water and mental-shock therapies.

Celina was freed from the hospital by Andrzej Towiański, who claimed to have miraculously cured her.  She believed his assurances that she had regained her mental health, and to the end of her life she remained under his influence and that of the Circle of God's Cause (Koło Sprawy Bożej).

Upon her death in 1855, she was interred at Paris' Père-Lachaise Cemetery.  Exhumed, her remains were transferred to Les Champeaux Cemetery at Montmorency.  The Mickiewicz family tomb exists there to the present day.

After Celina's death and the outbreak of the Crimean War in 1855, Adam Mickiewicz left his under-age children in Paris and went to Istanbul, Turkey, to organize legions to fight for Poland's independence from the Russian Empire.  At Istanbul, he contracted cholera and died.

References
Jadwiga Maurer, "Celina Szymanowska as a Frankist," The Polish Review, vol. XXXIV, no. 4, 1989, pp. 335–47. 
Patrycja Rogacz, "La bande infernale – o kobietach w domu Mickiewicza" ("La bande infernale:  About the Women in Mickiewicz's House"), N-C, 8 January 2011 
Zbigniew Sudolski, Panny Szymanowskie i ich losy (The Szymanowski Daughters and Their Fates), Ludowa Spółdzielnia Wydawnicza, 1982, .
Alina Witkowska, Celina i Adam Mickiewiczowie (Celina and Adam Mickiewicz), Kraków, Wydawnictwo Literackie, 1998, .
Alicja Zdziechowicz, "Celina - kobieta, która nie mieściła się w legendzie wieszcza" ("Celina:  the Woman Who Did Not Fit into the Bard's Legend"), in O czym nie mówią nam poloniści (What the Polish-Literature Scholars Do Not Tell Us), Warsaw, Wydawnictwo Szkolne PWN, 2011, pp. 162–63.
Tadeusz Boy-Żeleński, Brązownicy i inne szkice o Mickiewiczu (The Bardolators, and Other Sketches about Mickiewicz), Warsaw, 1930.

External links
 History of the Mickiewicz marriage 

1812 births
1855 deaths
Great Emigration
Polish composers
Polish classical pianists
Polish people of Jewish descent
Polish women composers
Polish women pianists
19th-century Polish women musicians
Adam Mickiewicz
19th-century women pianists